Eesti Rahvusringhääling (ERR) – Estonian Public Broadcasting – is a publicly funded and owned radio and television organisation created in Estonia on 1 June 2007 to take over the functions of the formerly separate Eesti Raadio (ER) (Estonian Radio) and Eesti Televisioon (ETV) (Estonian Television), under the terms of the Estonian National Broadcasting Act. The first chair of ERR is Margus Allikmaa, the former chair of Eesti Raadio. Present CEO is Erik Roose.

The organisation has proved popular since its creation, with ETV becoming the national television channel, creating and producing their own shows. Eesti Rahvusringhääling (ERR) can be streamed live from all around the world from online browsers as well as an app.

Services

Television
ERR's three national television channels are:
ETV – a general interest television channel
ETV2 – programming for children, sports, cultural programming, i.e. quality films and drama series
ETV+ – Russian-language television channel for Russian minority

Radio
ERR's five national radio stations are: 
Vikerraadio – a full-format programme
Raadio 2 – a station specialising in pop/underground music and aimed primarily at listeners aged 15–29
Klassikaraadio – recorded and live classical and folk music, jazz, and cultural programming
Raadio 4 – programming for linguistic minorities, in particular Estonia's Russian-speaking community
Raadio Tallinn – news and information for foreign listeners, including elements from ERR Uudised, BBC World Service and Radio France Internationale.

Internet news portals
rus.err.ee – news portal in Russian
ERR News – news portal in English
ERR Uudised – news portal in Estonian
ERR Sport – sports news portal in Estonian

History 
The Act, which was passed by the Estonian Parliament on 18 January 2007, also appointed Eesti Ringhäälingunõukogu (RHN) (the Estonian Broadcasting Council) to act as the regulatory body for ERR's five national radio channels and single television station.

Regular radio broadcasting in Estonia began on 18 December 1926. TV was first broadcast in Estonia on 19 July 1955. ERR receives a state grant to fund the operation of its five national radio channels and two TV channels. ERR participates in a number of projects within the European Broadcasting Union, of which it is a full member, notably in musical exchanges and concert series. In addition, ERR's Radio Drama Department has won international recognition at events organised by the EBU.

On 19 September 2014, the Estonian government approved the creation of a dedicated Russian-language TV channel as part of the ERR network. The channel ETV+ was launched in late September 2015.

In April 2019, the Estonian National Broadcasting Company announced that Kadarik Tüür Arhitektid won the design competition for the new TV house, expected to be completed in 2023. In the same month, 15 months of design work began. Estonian National Broadcasting intends to sell the buildings at Faehlmann 12, Faehlmann 10 and Gonsiori 27 in 2022 or 2023 due to depreciation. There is a decorative eye on the wall on the Gonsiori street side of the TV house.

See also

 Eesti Televisioon
 Eesti Raadio

References

External links 

 
 Estonian Public Broadcasting News 
 Overview of RHN 

 
Commercial-free television networks
Estonian companies established in 2007
Estonian news websites
Radio in Estonia
European Broadcasting Union members
Multilingual broadcasters
Publicly funded broadcasters
Television channels and stations established in 2007
Television channels in Estonia
Mass media in Tallinn